The Girl of My Dreams is a lost 1918 British silent film romance directed by Louis Chaudet and starring Billie Rhodes.

Cast
Billie Rhodes - The Weed
Jack McDonald - George Bassett
Lamar Johnstone - Kenneth Stewart (*as Lamar Johnston)
Golda Madden - Madelin Stewart
Jane Keckley - Ma Williams
Frank MacQuarrie - Pa Williams
Ben Suslow - Jed Williams (*as Benjamin Suslow)
Leo Pierson - Ralph Long

References

External links

 The Girl of My Dreams at IMDb.com

slide

1918 films
American silent feature films
Lost American films
Films directed by Louis Chaudet
American black-and-white films
American romance films
1910s romance films
1910s American films